This is a following list of the best-selling female rappers of all time, including albums and singles.

Figures for the list only includes pure sales figures and available figures after the 1990s: as of 2010 certifications have been combined with streaming or digital audio sales; in this list only digital sales are counted since most of today artists' pure sales are sold digitally.

Best-selling female rappers worldwide

Best-selling female rappers singles
Sales based on claimed figures and certifications.

Best-selling female rap albums worldwide

See also 
List of best-selling female music artists
List of best-selling girl groups
List of best-selling albums by women

References

Rappers, female
Rappers, female, best-selling
Rappers, female, best-selling